The 2018–19 ICC Men's T20 World Cup Americas Qualifier was the tournament played as part of qualification process for the 2021 ICC Men's T20 World Cup.

Twelve regional qualifiers were held by the International Cricket Council (ICC), with 62 teams competing during 2018 in five regions – Africa (3 groups), Americas (2), Asia (2), East Asia Pacific (2) and Europe (3). The top 25 sides from these progressed to five Regional Finals in 2019, with seven teams then going on to compete in the 2019 ICC T20 World Cup Qualifier, along with the six lowest ranked sides from the ICC T20I Championship.

The first sub-regional qualifier was held in Argentina and the other was held in the United States. The top two teams in each group advanced to the regional final tournament, which would determine two American entrants to the 2019 ICC T20 World Cup Qualifier. In April 2018, the International Cricket Council (ICC) granted full international status to Twenty20 men's matches played between member sides from 1 January 2019 onwards. Therefore, all the matches in the Regional Finals will be played as Twenty20 Internationals (T20Is).

From the Southern sub region group, both Bermuda and the Cayman Islands qualified for the Americas Regional Finals. From the Northern sub region, Canada and United States also qualified for the Americas Regional Finals.

The Regional Finals were held in Bermuda from 18 to 25 August 2019. Following the conclusion of matches that took place on 22 August 2019, Canada and Bermuda had both progressed to the T20 World Cup Qualifier.

Teams

Southern sub-region

The Southern sub region group was held in Argentina from 26 February to 3 March 2018.

Points table

(H) Host, (Q) Qualified to next stage
</noinclude>

Fixtures

Northern sub-region

The Northern sub region was held in the United States from 20 to 26 September 2018. Originally, the sub region matches were scheduled to start on 19 September, but were postponed by one day because of Hurricane Florence.

Points table

(H) Host, (Q) Qualified to next stage

Fixtures

Regional Finals

The Regional Finals were held in Bermuda from 18 to 25 August 2019, with the matches played at the Bermuda National Stadium and White Hill Field. On 21 August 2019, the Bermuda Cricket Board confirmed that all the remaining matches scheduled to be played at the Bermuda National Stadium would be moved to White Hill Field, due to the condition of the pitch. Canada won the Regional Finals to progress to the 2019 ICC T20 World Cup Qualifier. They were joined by Bermuda, who finished in second place.

Points table

Fixtures

Notes

References

External links
 Series home at ESPNcricinfo (Northern sub-regional qualifier)
 Series home at ESPNcricinfo (Regional Final)

ICC Men's T20 World Cup Qualifier
International cricket competitions in 2018–19
International cricket competitions in 2019
Qualifier